Nirbheek (lit. "fearless") is a 6-shot cylinder double-action revolver designed and manufactured by the Ordnance Factories Organization in Kanpur, India. 

It was sold at INR 122,360 or $USD 2,000.

History
The Nirbheek is marketed as India's first gun for women and it is named after Nirbheek, the alias given to a 23-year-old woman who was gang raped in Delhi on December 16, 2012, later dying of her injuries. The victim's alias Nirbhaya and the revolver's name, Nirbheek, both mean "fearless" in Hindi. The gun is illegal to carry in public in India without a permit, but these are almost impossible to obtain.

In 2014, it was reported that 100 women made bookings to purchase the revolver.

In 2015, it was reported that men were the majority of buyers that purchased the Nirbheek.

In 2016, buyers from Punjab lined up to purchase the Nirbheek.

Criticism 
The weapon attracted widespread criticism from women's groups and gun control advocates. They said that the 'revolver for women' was an insult to the memory of Nirbhaya, the victim, and it could not be the solution to violence against women. One gun control advocacy group said that they saw the launch of this gun by a state-owned factory as an admission of failure by the government. They claimed that women carrying guns are twelve times more likely to be shot by attackers compared to unarmed women.

The factory's general manager said that the gun would increase women's confidence and deter attackers. Critics say that not many women could afford the gun to defend themselves since it costs more than the average Indian's annual salary. Only high and middle-class women would be able to afford it but since these groups are not the most vulnerable (most of them use their own vehicle and do not need public transport), them having guns would not solve the problem. Carrying guns in public places in most parts of India are prohibited. 

In addition, Indian men are able to get a firearm license due to the bureaucracy of Indian firearm licensing system.

Design
The gun is black, slim and lightweight, with a titanium-alloy body and wooden grips. It weighs 0.5 kg and it is said it could be carried in a purse or bag.

The simple mechanism is thought to have been based on earlier designs by Webley & Scott and Smith & Wesson. While the Nirbheek has a range of 10 meters, it's effective to be used at 15 meters.

See also
IOF .32 Revolver
Webley Revolver
Enfield No. 2

References 

Weapons of India
Revolvers of India
.32 S&W Long firearms